Jules Cotard (1 June 1840 – 19 August 1889) was a French physician who practiced neurology and psychiatry. He is best known for first describing the Cotard delusion, a patient's delusional belief that they are dead, do not exist or do not have bodily organs.

Biography

Education
He studied medicine in Paris and later went on to work as an intern at  Hospice de la Salpêtrière, where he worked for, among others, Jean-Martin Charcot.

Career
Cotard became particularly interested in cerebrovascular accidents (commonly known as 'strokes') and their consequences and undertook autopsies to better understand how these affected the brain. In 1869, Cotard left Salpêtrière, and at the outbreak of the Franco-Prussian War, he joined an infantry regiment as a regimental surgeon. Cotard moved to the town of Vanves in 1874, where he remained for the last 15 years of his life. He made particular contributions to the understanding of diabetes and delusions. In August 1889, Cotard's daughter contracted diphtheria and he reportedly refused to leave her bedside for 15 days until she recovered. He eventually contracted diphtheria himself and died on 19 August.

In popular culture
Jules Cotard served as the real-life model for the character of Dr. Cottard in the Marcel Proust novel In Search of Lost Time.

In the film Synecdoche, New York, protagonist Caden Cotard is a reference to the Cotard Delusion.

External links and references
 

 

1840 births
1889 deaths
People from Issoudun
French neuroscientists
French military personnel of the Franco-Prussian War